is a professional race car driver.

Complete Super GT Results

References 

1982 births
Living people
Japanese racing drivers
Japanese Formula 3 Championship drivers
Super GT drivers

KCMG drivers
Formula Nippon drivers